Atys may refer to:
 Atys (King of Alba Longa), a king of Alba Longa in Roman mythology
 Atys of Lydia, an early king of Lydia, then probably known as Maeonia, and was the father of Lydus
 Atys (son of Croesus), the son of the later King Croesus of Lydia
 Tantalus (son of Broteas), husband of Clytemnestra in Greek mythology
 Atys (Lully), a 1676 tragédie lyrique by Jean-Baptiste Lully
 Atys, a poorly-studied Lydian solar deity, wrongly conflated with Attis in 19th century scholarship (see discussion in Attis)
 Atys (gastropod), a genus of gastropods in the family Haminoeidae
 Atys (Piccinni), a 1780 tragédie lyrique in three acts by Niccolò Piccinni
 Atys, a fictional planet that is the setting of the massively multiplayer online role-playing game Ryzom

See also 

 Atis (disambiguation)
 Attis, a Phrygian / Roman deity with a similar-sounding name, frequently but mistakenly equated with Atys (deity), due to a long-accepted 19th century scholarly error (see discussion in Attis)